The cave of Chufín is located in the town of Riclones in Rionansa (Cantabria), Spain. Situated at the confluence of the Lamasón and Nansa rivers, several caves ornamented with rock art pock the steep slopes above the water. Chufín is one of the caves included in UNESCO’s list of World Heritage sites under the entry Cave of Altamira and Paleolithic Cave Art of Northern Spain

It was discovered by the photographer Manuel de Cos Borbolla, a native of Rabago (Cantabria).

In Chufín were found different levels of occupation, the oldest being around 20000 years old. The small cave has some subtle engravings and paintings of red deer, goats, and cattle, all represented very schematically.

Also found in the cave were many symbols. One group, called type "sticks", accompanies the paintings inside animals. There are also many drawings using points (puntillaje), including one which has been interpreted as a representation of a vulva.

See also
 Art of the Upper Paleolithic
 List of Stone Age art

External links
 Human Timeline (Interactive) – Smithsonian, National Museum of Natural History (August 2016).

Archaeological sites in Spain
Bien de Interés Cultural landmarks in Cantabria
Caves containing pictograms in Spain
 
Limestone caves
Prehistoric sites in Spain
Show caves in Spain
World Heritage Sites in Spain
Paleolithic Europe
Cave of Altamira and Paleolithic Cave Art of Northern Spain